WOW Cargo Alliance is a global cargo alliance between SAS Cargo Group and Singapore Airlines Cargo.

WOW is the world's second largest cargo alliance consisting of only 2 members and is currently competing with the only other cargo alliance, SkyTeam Cargo. As of 2020, WOW Cargo Alliance is believed to be defunct for no information regarding the alliance was provided on both SAS Cargo and Singapore Airlines Cargo's website.

History
 2000 - WOW Cargo Alliance is established by SAS Cargo Group, Lufthansa Cargo and Singapore Airlines Cargo. 
 July 2002 - JAL Cargo joins the WOW Cargo Alliance.
 2009 - Lufthansa Cargo leaves the WOW Cargo Alliance.
 2010 - JAL Cargo ends cargo operations after more than 30 years of service and leaves the WOW Cargo Alliance.
2018 - Singapore Airlines Cargo re-integrated as a division within the SIA group

Cargo members

Former members

 Ended operations

References

 
Airline alliances